Gordon McGregor (4 January 1915 – 24 October 1982) was a New Zealand cricketer. He played four first-class matches for Otago between 1935 and 1940.

See also
 List of Otago representative cricketers

References

External links
 

1915 births
1982 deaths
New Zealand cricketers
Otago cricketers
Cricketers from Dunedin